Iceland's Minister for Nordic Cooperation is a cabinet minister who takes on this role in addition to his or her departmental responsibilities.

The Minister for Nordic Cooperation is responsible for coordinating the activities of Iceland within the Nordic Council. The minister is assisted by a Secretariat for Nordic Cooperation, under the ultimate responsibility of the Prime Minister.

List

See also 
 Minister for Nordic Cooperation (Denmark)
 Minister for Nordic Cooperation (Finland)
 Minister for Nordic Cooperation (Sweden)

External links
Secretariat for Nordic Cooperation

Nordic Cooperation
2009 establishments in Iceland
Nordic politics